Rieder Bach is a small river of Bavaria, Germany. It is a left tributary of the Rinchnach near the village Rinchnach.

See also
List of rivers of Bavaria

References 

Rivers of Bavaria
Rivers of Germany